Lari Lehtonen (born 21 June 1987 in Imatra) is a Finnish former cross-country skier who began competing at senior level in 2005. At the 2010 Winter Olympics in Vancouver, he finished 33rd in the 30 km mixed pursuit and 43rd in the 50 km event.

Lehtonen's best World Cup finish was 18th in a 15 km event at Estonia in 2010. He retired after the 2019–20 season.

Cross-country skiing results
All results are sourced from the International Ski Federation (FIS).

Olympic Games

World Championships

World Cup

Season standings

References

External links

1987 births
Living people
People from Imatra
Cross-country skiers at the 2010 Winter Olympics
Cross-country skiers at the 2014 Winter Olympics
Cross-country skiers at the 2018 Winter Olympics
Finnish male cross-country skiers
Tour de Ski skiers
Olympic cross-country skiers of Finland
Sportspeople from South Karelia
21st-century Finnish people